Nigeria competed at the 2018 Commonwealth Games in the Gold Coast, Australia from 4 to 15 April 2018.

Track and field athlete Blessing Okagbare was the country's flag bearer during the opening ceremony.

Medalists

|  style="text-align:left; vertical-align:top;"|

| width="22%" align="left" valign="top" |

Competitors
The following is the list of number of competitors participating at the Games per sport/discipline.

Athletics

Men
Track & road events

* Competed in the heats only.

Field events

Women
Track & road events

Field events

Basketball

Nigeria has qualified a men's basketball teams of 12 athletes. The team qualified after being ranked in the top three in the Commonwealth (besides the host nation, Australia).

Men's tournament

Roster

God'sgift Achiuwa
Azuoma Dike
Ike Diogu
Eli Dung
Uchenna Iroegbu
Yakubu Istifanus
Uchechi Ofoegbu
Olalekan Olatunji
Prince Orizu
Musa Usman
Abdul Yahaya
Abdulwahab Yakubu

Pool A

Qualifying finals

Boxing

Nigeria participated with a team of 8 athletes (4 men and 4 women)

Men

Women

Gymnastics

Artistic
Nigeria participated with 1 athlete (1 man).

Men
Individual Qualification

Rhythmic
Nigeria participated with 1 athlete (1 woman).

Individual Qualification

Table tennis

Nigeria participated with 7 athletes (6 men and 1 woman).

Singles

Doubles

Team

Para-sport

Weightlifting

Nigeria participated with 4 athletes (2 men and 2 women).

Powerlifting

Nigeria participated with 6 athletes (3 men and 3 women).

Wrestling

Nigeria participated with 12 athletes (6 men and 6 women).

Repechage Format

Group Stage Format

Nordic Format

See also
Nigeria at the 2018 Winter Olympics
Nigeria at the 2018 Summer Youth Olympics

References

Nations at the 2018 Commonwealth Games
2018
Commonwealth Games